Gooch shading is a non-photorealistic rendering technique for shading objects. It is also known as "cool to warm" shading, and is widely used in technical illustration.

History
Gooch shading was developed by Amy Gooch et al. at the University of Utah School of Computing and first presented at the 1998 SIGGRAPH conference. It has since been implemented in shader libraries, software, and games released by Autodesk, NVIDIA, and Valve.

Process
Gooch shading defines an additional two colors in conjunction with the original model color: a warm color (such as yellow) and a cool color (such as blue). The warm color indicates surfaces that are facing toward the light source while the cool color indicates surfaces facing away. This allows shading to occur only in mid-tones so that edge lines and highlights remain visually prominent. The Gooch shader is typically implemented in two passes: all objects in the scene are first drawn with the "cool to warm" shading, and in the second pass the object’s edges are rendered in black.

See also 

 List of common shading algorithms
 Phong shading
 Cel shading
 Non-photorealistic rendering

References

Shading
Computer graphics